GKO may refer to:

 GKO (Russian: , Gosudarstvennoye Kratkosrochnoye Obyazatyelstvo), a Russian bond issued in the mid-1990s
 Ancient Greek language
 GKO construction, in conformal field theory
 Gunna Kalan railway station, in Pakistan
 Kok-Nar language
 State Defense Committee (Russian: , Gosudarstvennyj komitet oborony) of the USSR